Lone Star Soccer Alliance was a soccer league that existed from 1987 to 1992. While most of the teams came from Texas, some also came from Oklahoma and Kansas.

History
First proposed by the Houston Dynamos, on April 18, 1987, the Lone Star Soccer Alliance was formed when the Dynamos were joined by Dallas Express, San Antonio International, and Austin Thunder. The league was initially associated with the Texas State Soccer Association South. In 1989, it was approved as a regional league by the United States Soccer Federation. The LSSA was created as a regional outdoor soccer league and as a development league for the professional league that American soccer fans hoped was on the horizon.

LSSA champions

Complete team list

References 

 
Defunct soccer leagues in the United States
Soccer in Texas